Ugia amaponda is a species of moth in the family Erebidae. It is found in Kenya, South Africa and Zimbabwe.

References

Moths described in 1874
Ugia
Moths of Africa